Henry Ulick Browne, 5th Marquess of Sligo (14 March 1831 – 24 February 1913), styled Lord Henry Browne until 1903, was an Irish peer.

Browne was the fourth son of Howe Browne, 2nd Marquess of Sligo, and Lady Hester Catherine de Burgh, daughter of John de Burgh, 13th Earl of Clanricarde. He succeeded to the marquessate in December 1903, aged 72, on the death of his unmarried elder brother. He married Catherine Henrietta Dicken, daughter of William Stephens Dicken, on 25 October 1855. They had ten children:

 George Browne, 6th Marquess of Sligo (1856–1935)
 Catherine Elizabeth Browne (1857–1874)
 Herbert Richard Browne (1858–1890)
 Lady Edith Hester Browne (1860–1936)
 Lady Florence Marion Browne (1863–1946)
 Arthur Browne, 8th Marquess of Sligo (1867–1951)
 Terence Browne, 9th Marquess of Sligo (1873–1952)
 Lady Nora Browne (1873–1948)
 Alice Evelyn Browne (1877–?)
 Lieutenant-Colonel Lord Alfred Eden Browne, DSO, Royal Field Artillery, (1878 – killed in action 27 August 1918)

The 5th Marquess is buried to the north-east of the main chapel at Kensal Green Cemetery in London.

References

 Burke's Irish Family Records, Hugh Montgomery-Massingberd, ed., 1976, p. 38.
 The Complete Peerage, volume XIV, 1998, p. 502.

People from County Mayo
1913 deaths
1831 births
Henry
Burials at Kensal Green Cemetery
Henry